Celia Robledo (born 7 April 1994) is a Spanish retired ice dancer. With her skating partner, Luis Fenero, she competed in the final segment at two ISU Championships — 2013 Junior Worlds in Milan, Italy; and 2016 Europeans in Bratislava, Slovakia.

Robledo competed in single skating early in her career. In 2011, she switched to ice dancing and teamed up with Fenero. They moved from Madrid, Spain to Lyon, France, to train under Muriel Boucher-Zazoui and Romain Haguenauer. In July 2014, they relocated with Haguenauer to Montreal, Quebec, Canada.

Programs

With Fenero

Single skating

Competitive highlights

With Fenero

Single skating

References

External links 

 
 Celia Robledo / Luis Fenero at sport-folio.net 
 
 Celia Robledo at sport-folio.net

1994 births
Spanish female ice dancers
Spanish female single skaters
Living people
People from Alcorcón
Sportspeople from the Community of Madrid
21st-century Spanish dancers
Competitors at the 2015 Winter Universiade
Competitors at the 2013 Winter Universiade